OnTrac is a privately held logistics company that contracts regional shipping services in the Western United States.

History 
The company was founded in California in 1991 as California Overnight and was formed from acquisitions of several small Canadian and American courier companies and expanded to seven additional states: Arizona, Nevada, Oregon, Washington, Utah, Colorado and Idaho. Initial customers were document shippers that sought an alternative to overnight delivery in California versus national carriers. As of 2020 the service area covers 20% of the United States population.

Controversies 

In 2014 OnTrac faced a class action lawsuit filed by Capstone Law APC on behalf of current and former drivers who worked for Express Messenger Systems, Inc. dba OnTrac (“OnTrac”) in a California location and were misclassified as independent contractors. The lawsuit, entitled Lewis, et. al. v. Express Messenger Systems, Inc., is currently pending in Los Angeles County Superior Court, Case No. BC501521. The lawsuit alleges the following violations against OnTrac:
 willfully misclassifying employees as “exempt” from overtime and other protections under the Labor Code;
 not paying all overtime wages;
 not paying California minimum wage (relating to hours worked off-the-clock);
 not providing employees with timely, uninterrupted meal and/or rest breaks;
 not paying employees one hour of pay as required by law for each missed meal and/or rest break;
 not providing employees proper wage statements (pay stubs);
 failing to reimburse business expenses; and
 not paying wages timely during employment and upon termination.

See also 
 Volumetric weight
 Logistics

References

Further reading

External links 
 

Companies based in Phoenix, Arizona
Logistics companies of the United States
Privately held companies of the United States
Shipping companies of the United States
Transport companies established in 1991
Transportation companies based in Arizona